Candidatus rerum politicarum (male), Candidata rerum politicarum (female), abbreviated cand.polit., is an academic degree in economics in Denmark and formerly an academic degree in all social sciences in Norway, including for example economics, psychology, sociology and political science.

Denmark
In Denmark, cand.polit. refers exclusively to the candidate's degree in economics awarded by the University of Copenhagen. Economics degrees from other Danish universities are known as cand. oecon and cand. merc.

Norway
In Norway, the cand.polit. was prior to 2003–2008 awarded in all social sciences by the faculties of social science at the universities, nominally requiring at least six years of study, although many students used somewhat longer time.

After the "Quality Reform" it has been replaced by a Master of Philosophy degree, shortening the nominal study time from six to five years. The cand.polit. degree was at the time of its abolition in practice a two-year or a two-and-a-half-year extension to the four-year cand.mag. degree or equivalent qualifications.

References

Master's degrees
Academic degrees of Denmark
Academic degrees of Norway